Nishnabotna Township is one of eleven townships in Atchison County, Missouri, United States. As of the 2010 census, its population was 155.

History
Nishnabotna Township was organized in 1845, taking its name from the Nishnabotna River which flows through it. Nishnabotna is an Indian name meaning "a river where boats were built".

Geography
It contains two cemeteries: Addington and Sonora. The Nishnabotna River enters the Missouri River in the northwest corner of the township. There is little physical relief, as the township lies almost entirely on the floodplains of the two rivers. The stream of High Creek runs through this township. Agriculture is the dominant land use.

Transportation
Nishnabotna Township contains one airport, Garst Airport.

In the media
Nishnabotna Township is probably best known outside the immediate region for a reference by the New Yorker cartoonist George Booth, a native of Missouri. In a single-panel cartoon, one threadbare and addled character says to another as they cross a crowded street in New York City: "Mother always says that. Mother always says you have to be a little bit crazy to live in New York. Mother is a little bit crazy, but she doesn't live in New York. Mother lives in Nishnabotna, Missouri."

References

 USGS Geographic Names Information System (GNIS)

External links
 US-Counties.com
 City-Data.com

Townships in Atchison County, Missouri
Townships in Missouri